Acronychia imperforata, commonly known as Logan apple, Fraser Island apple, or green tree, is a species of rainforest shrub or small tree that is endemic to north-eastern Australia. It has simple, elliptical to egg-shaped leaves, small groups of yellowish or creamy white flowers and fleshy spherical to oval fruit.

Description 

Taxonomy
Acronychia imperforata was first formally described in 1858 by Ferdinand von Mueller in Fragmenta phytographiae Australiae.

Distribution and habitat
Logan apple grows in rainforest in near-coastal areas between Somerset on Cape York in north-eastern Queensland and Seal Rocks in New South Wales.

Conservation status
This acronychia is classified as of "least concern" under the Queensland Government Nature Conservation Act 1992.

References

imperforata
Flora of New South Wales
Flora of Queensland
Plants described in 1858
Taxa named by Ferdinand von Mueller